Santiago Bellini Noya (born 19 September 1996) is a Uruguayan professional footballer who plays as a forward for Central Español.

Club career
He made his Uruguayan Primera División debut for Montevideo Wanderers on 15 March 2015 in a game against Atenas, as a half-time substitute for Gastón Rodríguez Maeso.

On 31 January 2019, he joined Italian Serie B club Pescara on loan.

On 2 September 2019, he moved to Spanish club Sporting de Gijón B on loan. However, Sporting announced on 30 January 2020, that the deal had been terminated by mutual consent.

References

External links
 

1996 births
People from Las Piedras, Uruguay
Living people
Uruguayan footballers
Uruguayan expatriate footballers
Association football forwards
Montevideo Wanderers F.C. players
Delfino Pescara 1936 players
Sporting de Gijón B players
Central Español players
Uruguayan Primera División players
Serie B players
Segunda División B players
Uruguayan expatriate sportspeople in Italy
Uruguayan expatriate sportspeople in Spain
Expatriate footballers in Italy
Expatriate footballers in Spain